Maurice Martin (born 18 November 1884, date of death unknown) was a French weightlifter. He competed in the men's featherweight event at the 1924 Summer Olympics.

References

External links
 

1884 births
Year of death missing
French male weightlifters
Olympic weightlifters of France
Weightlifters at the 1924 Summer Olympics
Place of birth missing